Gotland Naval District (MDG) was a Swedish Navy unit in the Swedish Armed Forces which existed in various forms from 1931 to 1956 when the unit was amalgamated with the East Coast Naval District. The unit was located in Visby, Gotland.

Commanding officers
Through the Defence Act of 1942, the military commander of Gotland also became commander of Gotland Naval District. Commanding officers of the naval district were:
1933–1937: Charles de Champs (as commanding officer of the East Coast Navy District)
1 October 1936–1937: Claës Lindsström (acting)
1937–1938: Göran Wahlström
1938–1942: Erik Braunerhielm
1942–1948: Samuel Åkerhielm (as commanding officer of the VII Military District)

References

External links
Website about Gotland Naval District  

Naval units and formations of Sweden
Military units and formations established in 1931
Military units and formations disestablished in 1956
Disbanded units and formations of Sweden
1931 establishments in Sweden
1956 disestablishments in Sweden
Visby Garrison